Hilde Haugsgjerd (born 7 July 1952) is a Norwegian newspaper editor.

She was born in Oslo. She was the party leader of the Red Electoral Alliance from 1979 to 1981, and was married to the party's first leader Sigurd Allern from 1972 to 1977.

She worked as a journalist in Klassekampen and Dagbladet, as well as information director of Rikshospitalet, before becoming a newspaper editor. She edited Dagsavisen from 2001 to 2004 as the first female editor of a national Norwegian newspaper, and then Aftenposten Aften from 2004 to 2008. In 2008 she became acting chief editor of Aftenposten since editor Hans Erik Matre underwent cancer treatment, and in 2009 she became the editor on a permanent basis.

References

1952 births
Living people
Writers from Oslo
Norwegian non-fiction writers
Red Party (Norway) politicians
Leaders of political parties in Norway
Norwegian newspaper editors
Norwegian women editors
Aftenposten editors
Norwegian women writers
Norwegian women non-fiction writers 
Women newspaper editors
Dagsavisen editors